A list of the tallest structures in Finland. This list contains all types of structures.

 
Finland
Landmarks in Finland
Tallest